Braith is a surname. Notable people with the surname include:

 Anton Braith (1836–1905), German painter
 George Braith (born 1939), American saxophonist

See also
 Braith Anasta (born 1982), Greek-Australian rugby league player